The 1917 season of the Paraguayan Primera División, the top category of Paraguayan football, was played by 8 teams. The national champions were Libertad.

Results

Liga Paraguaya de Fútbol

Asociación Paraguaya de Fútbol

National title play-off

External links
Paraguay 1917 season at RSSSF

Paraguayan Primera División seasons
Para
1